Marek Jan Jóźwik (born 10 April 1947 in Łódź) is a Polish former hurdler who competed in the 1972 Summer Olympics. He now works as a sports journalist and commentator for Telewizja Polska. He is also the president of the Polish Curling Association.

References

1947 births
Living people
Polish male hurdlers
Olympic athletes of Poland
Athletes (track and field) at the 1972 Summer Olympics
Sportspeople from Łódź
Skra Warszawa athletes
20th-century Polish people